Parker Mountain is a mountain located in the Catskill Mountains of New York east-northeast of Hunter. Onteora Mountain is located west, Stoppel Point is located east, Black Dome is located north-northeast, Star Rock is located east-northeast, and Thomas Cole Mountain is located north of Parker Mountain.

References

Mountains of Greene County, New York
Mountains of New York (state)